Rachel Ankeny  is a professor of history and philosophy of science at University of Adelaide. In 2020, she was elected as a fellow in the American Association for the Advancement of Science (AAAS) "for her contributions to our understanding of the foundational roles that organisms play in biological research and her leadership in history and philosophy of science." She is currently the president-elect of the International Society for the History, Philosophy, and Social Studies of Biology (ISHPSSB).

Biography 
After finishing her B.A. at St. John's College (Santa Fe), studying the Great Books curriculum, Ankeny held an independent Thomas J. Watson Fellowship to explore families' understandings of and responses to Huntington disease risk in England, Scotland, Wales, and Denmark. She then worked for Encyclopædia Britannica (on their Great Books products) and the Paideia Program in Chicago for 3 years. Ankeny received her M.A. in bioethics and philosophy from the University of Pittsburgh, and her Ph.D. under James G. Lennox in the History and Philosophy of Science from the University of Pittsburgh. She also holds a M.A. degree in Gastronomy from the University of Adelaide, where she wrote a thesis on celebratory food habits among immigrants of Italo-Australian and Italian-American origin. Prior to joining the faculty of the University of Adelaide, she was director of the Unit for History and Philosophy of Science at the University of Sydney (2000-2006). She is currently the Deputy Dean Research for the Faculty of Arts and is a Professor of History and Philosophy at the University of Adelaide.

Research  
Ankeny's work in the history and philosophy of science concerns the use of scientific models, case-based reasoning, and model organisms. She is currently leading the project Organisms and Us: How living things help us to understand our world. Investigators under the project include Sabina Leonelli and Michael Dietrich. This project investigates the roles of non-human organisms in biological research and how researchers use organisms in 20th and early 21st-century science.

Her expertise also includes bioethics, science policy, migration and food studies. She is the leader of the Food Values Research Group at University of Adelaide. The research group seeks to understand the decision-making processes behind everyday food choices and how they are shaped by social, cultural and historical influences.

Recognition  
In 2020, Ankeny was elected as a History and Philosophy of Science Fellow of the American Association for the Advancement of Science. She was elected president of ISHPSSB in 2019. Ankeny was elected a Fellow of the Academy of the Social Sciences in Australia in 2022.

Media appearances 
Ankeny has been frequently interviewed by national and international networks and programs on issues including genetic editing and GMO labeling, the quality and value of foods, updates to the Food Standards Australia New Zealand, and eating habits. She has been invited as a guest on multiple programs at ABC Radio National, including Robyn Williams's Ockham's Razor, Jonathan Green's Blueprint, the Health Report, Linda Mottram's PM, and the Catalyst. Her bylines include The Conversation, Online Opinion, The ABC's Religion and Ethics portal. On the COVID-19 pandemic, she has been interviewed by news networks to comment on ethical concerns related to coronavirus "certificates"  and the impacts of lockdown rules for the food sector.

Selected publications 
 Model Organisms (2020) with Sabina Leonelli.

References

External links 
 Homepage
 
 

Philosophy academics
Australian philosophers
Australian women philosophers
Philosophers of science
Fellows of the American Association for the Advancement of Science
Living people
Year of birth missing (living people)
Fellows of the Academy of the Social Sciences in Australia